Anything Can Happen is an album by singer and songwriter Leon Russell, his first following a ten-year break after the release of his last studio album Solid State. The album was released in 1994 and produced by Russell along with Bruce Hornsby with most of the songs written by the two. The album was released by Virgin in the UK and USA.

People Magazine reviewed the album: "From the marvelous shadows-and-light pop of the title track to the Turkish-ish Black Halos to inventive reworkings of Chuck Berry’s Too Much Monkey Business and Jezebel, this comely comeback is smooth but packs a kick.

On July 21, 1999 Leon performed the Anything Can Happen song on the David Letterman Show live.

Track listing
 "Anything Can Happen" (Bruce Hornsby, Leon Russell) – 4:06
 "Black Halos" (B. Hornsby, Russell) – 3:43
 "No Man's Land" (B. Hornsby, Russell) – 3:38
 "Too Much Monkey Business" (Chuck Berry) – 2:58
 "Angel Ways" (B. Hornsby, Russell) – 4:01
 "Life of the Party" (B. Hornsby, Russell) – 2:51
 "Stranded on Easy Street" (B. Hornsby, John Hornsby) – 4:25
 "Jezebel" (Traditional, arranged by Leon Russell) – 3:51
 "Love Slave" (Russell) – 3:01
 "Faces of the Children" (B. Hornsby, Russell) – 3:45

Personnel
Vocals, guitar – Leon Russell 
Keyboards - Bruce Hornsby
Guest artist - Edgar Winter

References

External links

Leon Russell discography
Leon Russell lyrics
Leon Russell Records
Leon Russell NAMM Oral History Program Interview (2012)

1994 albums
Leon Russell albums
Albums produced by Leon Russell
Virgin Records albums